Donji Milješ is a village in the municipality of Tuzi, Montenegro. It is located northeast of Tuzi town and used to be part of Podgorica Municipality.

Demographics
According to the 2003 census, it had a population of 391.

According to the 2011 census, its population was 512.

References

Populated places in Tuzi Municipality
Albanian communities in Montenegro